is a passenger railway station located in the city of Moriyama, Shiga Prefecture, Japan, operated by the West Japan Railway Company (JR West).

Lines

Station layout
The station consists of two opposed side platforms connected by an elevated station building. The station has a Midori no Madoguchi staffed ticket office.

Platforms

Adjacent Stations

History
The station opened on 16 April 1912 as a station for both passenger and freight operations on the Japanese Government Railway (JGR), which became the Japan National Railway (JNR) after World War II. The station was bombed by American aircraft on 30 July 1945, killing 11 people. The current station building was completed in 1973.The station became part of the West Japan Railway Company on 1 April 1987 due to the privatization and dissolution of the JNR.

Station numbering was introduced to the station in March 2018 with Moriyama being assigned station number JR-A22.

Passenger statistics
In fiscal 2019, the station was used by an average of 17,283 passengers daily (boarding passengers only).

According to the "Shiga Prefecture Statistical Book", the average daily ridership is as follows

Surrounding area
 Moriyama City Hall
 Shiga Prefectural General Hospital
 Shiga Medical Center for Children
 Moriyama Municipal Hospital
 Moriyama City Irigaoka Elementary School

See also
List of railway stations in Japan

References

External links

JR West official home page

Railway stations in Japan opened in 1912
Tōkaidō Main Line
Railway stations in Shiga Prefecture
Moriyama, Shiga